Alatinidae is a family of box jellyfish within class Cubozoa, containing the following genera and species:

 Alatina
 Alatina alata (Reunaud, 1830)
 Alatina grandis (Agassiz & Mayer, 1902)
 Alatina madraspatana (Menon, 1930)
 Alatina mordens Gershwin, 2005 [synonym of A. moseri]
 Alatina moseri (Mayer, 1906)
 Alatina obeliscus (Haeckel, 1880)
 Alatina philippina (Haeckel, 1880)
 Alatina pyramis (Haeckel, 1880)
 Alatina rainensis Gershwin, 2005
 Alatina tetraptera (Haeckel, 1880)
 Alatina turricola (Haeckel, 1880)
 Manokia
 Manokia stiasnyi (Bigelow, 1938)
 Keesingia
 Keesingia gigas (Gershwin, 2014)

References

 
Carybdeida
Cnidarian families